"Oceans with No End" is a single by the American synthpop band Cold Cave. The single was released in 2013 through Deathwish Inc. — a label co-founded by Jacob Bannon of Converge. "Oceans with No End" was also the first release from the band following the death of former Cold Cave contributor Justin Benoit.

Critical reception
In his track review, Ian Cohen of Pitchfork wrote that "the track draws from Cherish the Light Years potent and extremely loud alchemy of goth-rock and jock-jams." He also stated: "Befitting its lower-stakes release, "Oceans with No End" is a little more brittle and streamlined than "The Great Pan Is Dead", but it regardless captures that all-consuming sense of ambition and yearning contained within the latter." On the b-side "People Are Poison", Cohen also stated: "People allows a more exploratory approach to finding new angles on tried and true influences, turning the shuffle in DM's ten-gallon hat goth into something more linear while adding the grainy, brittle distortion of early Jesus and Mary Chain."

Track listing
All songs written, recorded and performed by Wes Eisold.
Side A
 "Oceans with No End" – 4:35
Side B
 "People Are Poison" – 3:57

Personnel
"Oceans with No End" personnel adapted from liner notes.
 Jacob Bannon – art design
 Wesley Eisold – recording, composition, all instruments, art direction
 Kris Lapke – mixing, mastering
 Dan Rawe – photography

References

External links
 

Albums with cover art by Jacob Bannon
2013 singles
Deathwish Inc. EPs
2013 songs
Cold Cave songs